Padraccio is an Italian cheese made in Basilicata, typical of the Pollino National Park area. It is recognized as a prodotto agroalimentare tradizionale (traditional regional food product) of Basilicata.

The cheese is made from a mixture of the milk of the Lucana Grey goat – a rare breed of goat from the Apennines – and sheep's milk.

Production
The cheese is produced between April and July. Raw milk is heated to  degrees before the (sheep or goat) rennet is added. The cheese sets in 20–30 minutes. When the curds break, the cheese is transferred to a wicker container and worked with the fingers. It is then pressed, using the flat of the hand, to end up with a spherical shape. Finally, this fresh cheese with no added salt needing no ripening time is wrapped in fern leaves.

See also
List of cheeses
List of Italian cheeses

Notes

Lucanian cheeses
Sheep's-milk cheeses